Oscar Slagle (2 April 1844 - 12 April 1913) was a private in the United States Army who was awarded the Medal of Honor for gallantry at the Battle of Elk River in Tennessee during the American Civil War.

Personal life 
Slagle was born on 2 April 1844 in Fulton County, Ohio. His city of residence was listed as Manlius, Illinois. He married Lucy Jane Zerby in 1869 and fathered 5 children. He died on 12 April 1913 in Cullom, Illinois and was buried in Broughton Township Cemetery in Kempton, Illinois. He was honored as a state Medal of Honor winner in 1999 by the 91st General Assembly of the State of Illinois.

Military service 
Slagle enlisted in the Army as a private on 4 August 1862 in Manlius and was mustered into Company D of the 104th Illinois Infantry on 27 August 1862. He was promoted to corporal at an unknown time. On 2 July 1863, at the Battle of Elk River, he was among a group of ten volunteers including leader George K. Marsh, Reuben Smalley, John Shapland, Charles Stacey, Richard J. Gage, and Samuel F. Holland, that successfully captured a Confederate defensive fortification while under heavy fire. All ten men would eventually win Medals of Honor. Slagle received his medal on 30 October 1897.

Slagle's Medal of Honor citation reads:

Slagle was mustered out of the Army on 6 June 1865 at Washington D.C.

References 

1844 births
1913 deaths
People from Ohio
American Civil War recipients of the Medal of Honor
Union Army soldiers
People of Illinois in the American Civil War